Picnic is a 1975 Indian Malayalam-language film,  directed by J. Sasikumar and produced by C. C. Baby and V. M. Chandi. The film stars Prem Nazir, Lakshmi, Unnimary and Adoor Bhasi. The film's musical score was composed by M. K. Arjunan. It was one of the biggest hits of Prem Nazir

Cast

Prem Nazir as Ravi Varma, Rajagopal
Lakshmi as Maala
Unnimary as Radha
Adoor Bhasi AB Menon
Jose Prakash Aadivasi Moopan
Bahadoor as Venu
Kaduvakulam Antony as Sugunan 
M. G. Soman as Chudala Muthu
 Sreelatha Namboothiri as Vasanthi
Meena as Manonmani
Vijayaraghavan
Vincent as Babu
 Manavalan Joseph as Panicker

Soundtrack
The music was composed by M. K. Arjunan with lyrics by Sreekumaran Thampi.

References

External links
 

1975 films
1970s Malayalam-language films
Films scored by M. K. Arjunan